The Newport Railway Workshops is a facility in the Melbourne suburb of Newport, Australia, that builds, maintains and refurbishes railway rollingstock. It is located between the Williamstown and Werribee railway lines.

History
Plans for a workshop at Newport started in the 1860s, to replace the temporary Williamstown Workshops but nothing came of it. It was not until 1880 that work began, when the Victorian Railways purchased annexes used at the 1880 Melbourne Exhibition and erected one of them at Newport, naming it the Newport Carriage Workshops when it began operation in 1882.

Construction of the permanent workshops commenced in 1884, and was completed in 1889. Although the earlier carriage workshop closed at this time, it reopened in 1895 to manufacture signal equipment. The first carriages built by the workshops were completed in 1889, but locomotives were manufactured by the Phoenix Foundry in Ballarat, the first locomotive being built in 1893. The main elements of the workshops are a central office block and clock tower, the 'East Block' for carriage and wagon works, and 'West Block' for heavy engineering and locomotive building.  Expansion followed in 1905–1915, and 1925–1930. During World War II the workshops were turned over to military production, with the rear fuselage, and empennage of Bristol Beaufort bombers being built there.

At the peak of operation it was one of Victoria's largest and best-equipped engineering establishments, with up to 5,000 employees on site. The workshops had its own cricket ground, and in the 1920s the game of Trugo is said to have been invented by workers on their lunch hour. In the late 1980s, the original segments of the workshops were removed from everyday use, and modern workshops built along the eastern side of the site, which remains in use today.

On 15 January 2000, ownership of the workshops passed from the Public Transport Corporation to Clyde Engineering.

Tenants

Current revenue operations are carried out in the eastern section of the workshops by Downer Rail, who carry out work including locomotive and carriage maintenance, and diesel engine, bogie and wheelset overhauls; for customers including Pacific National and V/Line. The workshop also has the one of 2 broad gauge underfloor wheel lathes in Victoria, the other being in the Pakenham East Depot. From 2018, it will build the High Capacity Metro Trains. A section of the workshops is leased to Siemens for maintenance of their Siemens Nexas trains.

The original 1880s workshops have been maintained for heritage uses. The 'West Block' area are occupied by a number of railway preservation groups such as Steamrail Victoria, Diesel Electric Rail Motor Preservation Association Victoria and 707 Operations, while the 'East Block' has been retained by the Department of Infrastructure for the storage of disused trams and other rail rollingstock. The Newport Railway Museum is located south of the workshops, near North Williamstown railway station.

Gallery

See also
 Steamrail Victoria
 707 Operations

References

Further reading
 The Newport Story Doenau G Australian Railway Historical Society Bulletin November; December 1979 pages 249-272, 274-288
 Reminiscences of an Apprentice at the Victorian Railways' Newport Workshops 1959-1963 Clark, AJ Australian Railway Historical Society Bulletin, February 1996 pages 35–55
 Experience at Newport Workshops 1941-1946 Whalley, SC Australian Railway Historical Society Bulletin, November 2002 pages 403–406

External links

Railway workshops in Victoria (Australia)
1882 establishments in Australia
Buildings and structures in the City of Hobsons Bay
Transport in the City of Hobsons Bay